Isabella was launched in 1825 at Shoreham. Initially, she traded with Gibraltar and Honduras. The Hudson's Bay Company (HBC) purchased her in 1829 and she was wrecked in 1830 on the Columbia River bar.

Career
Isabella first appeared in Lloyd's Register (LR) in 1827.

She was already trading by then. Lloyd's List reported in that Isabella, Cowle, master, had arrived at Omoa from Gibraltar. She was back at Gibraltar from Honduras on 14 July.

On 10 October 1829 the Hudson's Bay Company purchased Isabella for £2,900. The company purchased her to replace , which had wrecked on the Columbia bar in May with the loss of all hands.

Isabella sailed from Blackwall on 30 October for the Colombia via the Sandwich Islands. On 3 May 1830, she wrecked on the Columbia bar. There was no loss of life; the crew arrived at Fort Vancouver. As it turned out, Isabella was stranded but had not sunk. The HBC factor at Fort Vancouver sent Ryan and his men to salvage what of her cargo and stores they could. They finally abandoned her on 24 May. They reached Fort Vancouver again on 4 June. The news was published in England in April 1831.

Post script
In 1986, researchers thought fisherman Daryl Hughes of Chinook had discovered the wreck of Isabella. It was later determined that the remains were those of the 1879 wreck , not Isabella.

Citations

References
 

1827 ships
Age of Sail merchant ships of England
Hudson's Bay Company ships
Maritime incidents in May 1830